Raquel Atawo and Abigail Spears were the defending champions, but lost in the second round to Gabriela Dabrowski and María José Martínez Sánchez.
Chan Hao-ching and Chan Yung-jan won the title, defeating Sara Errani and Carla Suárez Navarro in the final, 6–3, 6–3.

Seeds 
The top four seeds received a bye into the second round.

Draw

Finals

Top half

Bottom half

References
Main Draw

2016 WTA Tour
2016,Doubles
2016 in Qatari sport